Golimar may refer to:

 Golimar, Karachi, a neighbourhood of S.I.T.E. Town, Karachi, Pakistan
 Golimaar (film), a 2010 Telugu action film
 "Golimar", a song from the 1985 Telugu film Donga

See also
 Old Golimar, another neighbourhood of S.I.T.E Town